Hotel Revival is a 107-room boutique hotel in the Mount Vernon neighborhood of Baltimore, Maryland. The hotel opened in 2018 in the former Peabody Court Hotel building, constructed in 1928. It is operated by Joie de Vivre Hospitality. The building is a contributing structure to the Mount Vernon Historic District, a Baltimore City Historic District, and a National Historic Landmark District.

The hotel has amenities including a rooftop restaurant, three private karaoke rooms, and a lounge-like lobby.

The opening of the hotel was part of a 21st century revitalization of the Mount Vernon neighborhood, after a severe city-wide downturn in the 1990s.

References

External links
 

Hotels in Baltimore
2018 establishments in the United States
Mount Vernon, Baltimore
Hotel buildings completed in 1928
Apartment buildings in Baltimore